Władysław Nicefor Count Umiastowski was a Polish szlachcic from the family of the Counts Pierzchała-Umiastowski.
He was marshal of szlachta in Ashmyany.

His property was: 
 Żemłosław in Belarus
 Rękoraj in Poland
 Puzyniewicze in Belarus

External links
 Żemłosław village

1834 births
1905 deaths
Counts of Poland
Wladyslaw